"Zero Worship" is the 11th episode in the second season, and the 34th episode overall, of the American dramedy series Ugly Betty, which aired on January 10, 2008. The episode was written by Dawn DeKeyser and directed by Ron Underwood.

Plot
Amanda turns to a psychic in her quest to find her birth father; Betty wants Daniel to use models of all shapes and sizes at Fashion Week after Justin's friends get a different impression on their class tour of Mode, but Alexis proves an obstacle due to her domineering ways. Meanwhile, Wilhelmina is hormonal and trying to find someone to be a surrogate mother for her baby.

Production
This episode was supposed to make its airing debut on January 3, 2008, but last minute schedule changes pushed its airing back a week.

Reception
In TV Guide's "Ask Matt" column, Matt Roush touted this episode as one of his favorites.

Ratings
The episode would go on to win its timeslot with a 6.7/11 share and more than 10 million viewers tuning in. However, in the January 7th-13th 2008 Nielsen weekly ratings it came in 27th, with Fox's Are You Smarter Than a 5th Grader?, which aired opposite Betty, edging the episode out by nearly 100,000 viewers.

References

Also starring
Alec Mapa as Suzuki St. Pierre
Wendy Benson as Veronica
Juliette Goglia as Hilary
Derek Riddell as Stuart McKinney

Guest stars
Annie Potts as Linda,
Rob Brownstein as Dr. Weiss
Omarion as himself
Bow Wow as himself
Elizabeth McLaughlin as Lindsay
Hannah Marks as Taylor
Carol Ann Susi as Mrs. Galeano
Jennifer Norkin as Brandy
Jonathan Kehoe as "Player" Editor
Robyn Moran as "Cucina" Editor
Ashley Estrella as 12-year-old Betty
 

Ugly Betty (season 2) episodes
2008 American television episodes